Rifle Range Halt railway station (Morayshire) served the town of Lossiemouth, Moray, Scotland from 1940 to 1950 on the Morayshire Railway.

History 
The station opened by the London and North Eastern Railway and was in use in 1926. It primarily served a rifle range east of the halt, hence the name. It closed in 1950. The trackbed survived after the vegetation was cleared.

References

External links 

Disused railway stations in Moray
Former London and North Eastern Railway stations
Railway stations in Great Britain opened in 1926
Railway stations in Great Britain closed in 1950
1926 establishments in Scotland
1950 disestablishments in Scotland